Rondane National Park is the oldest national park in Norway, having been established on 21 December 1962. The park is located in Innlandet county, in the municipalities of Dovre, Folldal, Sel, Nord-Fron, Sør-Fron, Stor-Elvdal, and Ringebu. The park is an important habitat for herds of wild reindeer.

Rondane lies just to the east of the Gudbrandsdalen valley and two other mountain areas, Dovre and Jotunheimen are nearby. Dovre National Park lies a very short distance to the north of this park.

Geography
Rondane is a typical high mountain area, with large plateaus and a total of ten peaks above . The climate is mild but relatively arid. Apart from the white birch trees of the lower areas, the soil and rocks are covered by heather and lichen, since they lack nutrients. The largest mountains are almost entirely barren; above  nothing but the hardiest lichens grow on the bare stones.

The mountains are divided by marked valleys through the landscape; the deepest valley is filled by Rondvatnet, a narrow lake filling the steep space between the large Storronden–Rondeslottet massif and Smiubelgen ("The blacksmith's bellows"). The central massif is also cut by "botns": flat, dead stone valleys below the steep mountain walls of the peaks. Generally, Rondane does not receive enough precipitation to generate persistent glaciers, but glacier-like heaps of snow can be found in the flat back valleys.

At the centre of the park lies the lake Rondvatnet, from which all the peaks above  in elevation can be reached in less than one day's walk. In this central region and north of it, the altitude is quite high compared with the flatter plateaus of the south. Rondane has ten peaks over  including: 

 Rondeslottet, 
 Storronden, 
 Høgronden, 
 Midtronden western summit, 
 Vinjeronden, 
 Midtronden eastern summit, 
 Trolltinden, 
 Storsmeden, 
 Digerronden, 
 Veslesmeden, 

In many parts of the park, there are spread-out holes (kettle holes) created by small remains of ice age glaciers, and peculiar small hills called "eskers" made by ground moraine released by melting glaciers.

History

Prehistory
The history of life in the area of the park begins at the end of the latest ice age. Large climate changes allowed reindeer to spread widely across Scandinavia, only to be forced back to a much smaller area — including the Rondane mountain area — only some hundreds of years later.

On the mountain plateaux, there is evidence that nomadic hunter-gatherers lived off reindeer. Large traps used to catch reindeer can be found at Gravhø and Bløyvangen and are also spread all throughout the park. These are constructed from stone to make holes or large fenced-in areas into which reindeer could be tricked or led.

In conjunction with these large traps, there are also small arched stone walls which are believed to have been used as hiding places for archers waiting for prey. Various dating methods have suggested that the earliest traps may be as old as 3500 years. Most of the findings, including remains of houses, date back to the years between 500 and 700 AD. It is thus known with confidence that the large traps and accompanying walls were used from the 6th century until the onset of the Black Death in the 14th century.

Establishment

After nearly a decade of planning, Rondane was established as the first Norwegian National Park on 21 December 1962. It was first established as a nature protection area, but was later named a national park. The main reasons for protecting the park were "to safeguard the natural environment with its native plants, animal life, and cultural heritage and also to secure the environment as a recreational area for future generations".

Legal efforts to protect nature in Norway date from 1954, when the nature protection law was passed. Soon after, in 1955, community meetings were held in the municipalities close to Rondane, and a commission was founded. Norman Heitkøtter was president of the commission, and made it possible by Royal resolution to establish Rondane National Park.

Although Rondane was the first national park in Norway, many others followed. The parks are maintained by the Norwegian Directorate for Nature Management.

2003 expansion
The park was enlarged mainly to the north-west, and slightly in the east and south. In addition, areas with lesser protection (landscape protection as well as nature protection areas) were established in connection with the park. A new national park, Dovre National Park, between Rondane and Dovrefjell-Sunndalsfjella National Park was also opened.

Geology

The bedrock in Rondane comes from a shallow sea floor, created 500 to 600 million years ago. From this, changes in the Earth's crust created a mountain area of metamorphic rock and quartz. There are no fossils found in Rondane today and so it is thought the sea where the rock came from contained no animal life.

The present landscape was mostly formed by the last ice age, nine to ten thousand years ago. At that time large quantities of ice were formed, and it is believed that the ice melted gradually in shifting cycles of melting and ice accumulation. The ice melting must have been rapid when it happened, digging deep river valleys.

Rondane contains a few small canyons which were created by the rapid ice melting, most prominently Jutulhogget and Vesle-Ula.

Biology
Rondane is one of the few places in Scandinavia and Europe where wild reindeer (as opposed to the domestic breed) are found.  The Directorate for Nature Management regards Rondane as "especially important as a life supporting area for the native reindeer".  It is estimated that approximately 2000 to 4000 reindeer live in Rondane and the nearby Dovre area. To protect the reindeer population in their core area, during  hiking trails have been moved. The park was also enlarged in 2003 to provide increased protection for the reindeer.

Other large game, including roe deer and elk (moose) are commonplace along the rims of the park and occasionally musk ox from Dovre can be seen. Wolverines, lynxes, and a small population of bears are also present, while wolves are rare.

The reindeer largely rely on the lichen and reindeer moss that grow together with heather and hardy grass on the quite arid and nutrient-poor stony plateaus. The lichen provide food for the reindeer, but also fertilize the earth, making it possible for less hardy plants to grow, and mice and lemmings to feed.

Tourism

Visitors to Rondane are free to hike and camp in all areas of the park, except in the immediate vicinity of cabins. Apart from being closed for motor traffic, not many special regulations apply. Fishing and hunting is available to licensees.
 
The Norwegian Mountain Touring Association (DNT) is an association that owns and manages a network of mountain cabins in the service of hikers. In Rondane, there is a central cabin by the southern end of the lake Rondvatnet, Rondvassbu. There is also Dørålseter and Bjørnhollia at the northern and eastern rims of the park. All three cabins are manned, and provide food and limited accommodation (possible to book beforehand). There are also un-manned cabins in the Park, like Eldåbu where a key is needed.

DNT also mark trails in the Park, with red Ts that are easy to spot. The T-trails lead the way cabin-to-cabin, as well as marking the path to some of the peaks close to Rondvatnet. Recently, some of the trails have moved slightly to avoid the core areas of the wild reindeer.

The service cabins are also open during the winter season, although they are sometimes only self-serviced off season. Ski trails are marked and sometimes prepared, either by DNT or some of the hotels and skiing resorts close to the park.

Rondane Høyfjellshotell

Environmentally-friendly energy is created by the hotel through its own hydropower plant. The hotel has a total of 210 beds in 50 rooms, 4 apartments and 10 cabins. Amenities include a gym, spa, pool, sauna, and restaurant. The hotel also has opportunities for physical activities including biking, hiking, cross country skiing, and rafting. There is also the capacity for conferences and parties at the hotel.

The hotel was built in 1939 and burned down in 1961. In 1963 a new hotel was opened to guests. The existing building has  on 3 floors. In 2016 there were renovations works at the hotel with significant upgrades to the spa, pool, and common areas. Most of the rooms were refurbished, as well as the bathroom of those rooms.

Rondane in literature
The landscapes of Rondane have inspired many Norwegian writers. Probably the best-known work is Peer Gynt (1867), a play by Henrik Ibsen, which is partly set in Rondane:

Act 2, Scene lV
(Among the Ronde mountains. Sunset. Shining snowpeaks all around.
Peer Gynt enters, dizzy and bewildered.)
Peer
Tower over tower arises! Hei, what a glittering gate! Stand! Will you stand! It's drifting further and further away! ...
With this scene, Ibsen wrote Rondane into one of the 19th centuries better-known plays and made Rondane a symbol for Norway.

Peter Christen Asbjørnsen, writer and gatherer of Norwegian folk tales in the mid-19th century, collected many stories connected with Rondane, including Peer Gynt, the story that inspired Ibsen.
A third writer who set one of his famous works in Rondane is the poet Aasmund Olavsson Vinje with his poem Ved Rundarne.

Name
Rondane is the finite plural of the word rond. Several mountains in the area have the ending -ronden (Digerronden, Høgronden, Midtronden, Storronden and Vinjeronden), and this is the finite singular of the same word. The word rond was probably originally the name of the long and narrow lake Rondvatnet ('Rond water/lake') - and the mountains around were then named after this lake. For the meaning see under Randsfjorden.

See also

Tourism in Norway
Norwegian Trekking Association
List of national parks of Norway
Dovre National Park
Dovrefjell-Sunndalsfjella National Park
Peer Gynt

References

External links

VisitRondane.com
Norwegian Directorate for Nature Management map of Rondane
Rondvassbu
Map
Images from Rondane
Rondane Høyfjellshotell

 
National parks of Norway
Protected areas established in 1962
Protected areas of Innlandet
Tourist attractions in Innlandet
1962 establishments in Norway
Dovre
Folldal
Sel
Stor-Elvdal
Nord-Fron
Sør-Fron
Ringebu